Anisogona is a genus of moths belonging to the subfamily Tortricinae of the family Tortricidae.

Species
Anisogona hilaomorpha (Turner, 1926)
Anisogona mediana (Walker, 1863)
Anisogona notoplaga (Turner, 1945)
Anisogona simana (Meyrick, 1881)
Anisogona similana (Walker, 1863)
Anisogona thysanoma (Meyrick, 1910)

See also
List of Tortricidae genera

References

External links
Tortricid.net

Tortricidae genera
Epitymbiini